Prilocaine is a local anesthetic of the amino amide type first prepared by Claes Tegner and Nils Löfgren.  In its injectable form (trade name Citanest), it is often used in dentistry.  It is also often combined with lidocaine as a topical preparation for dermal anesthesia (lidocaine/prilocaine or EMLA), for treatment of conditions like paresthesia.  As it has low cardiac toxicity, it is commonly used for intravenous regional anaesthesia (IVRA).

Contraindications 
In some patients, ortho-toluidine, a metabolite of prilocaine, may cause methemoglobinemia, which may be treated with methylene blue.  Prilocaine may also be contraindicated in people with sickle cell anemia, anemia, or symptomatic hypoxia.

Combinations 
It is given as a combination with the vasoconstrictor epinephrine under the trade name Citanest Forte. It is used as a eutectic mixture with lidocaine, 50% w/w, as lidocaine/prilocaine. A 5% emulsion preparation, containing 2.5% each of lidocaine/prilocaine, is marketed by APP Pharmaceuticals under the trade name EMLA (an abbreviation for eutectic mixture of local anesthetics).

Compendial status 
 United States Pharmacopeia 31

Synthesis

The amidation between o-toluidine [95-53-4] (1) and 2-bromopropionyl bromide [563-76-8] (2) leads to 2-bromo-N-(2-methylphenyl)propanamide [19397-79-6] (3). Displacement of the remaining halide with propylamine [107-10-8] (4) completed the synthesis of prilocaine (5).

See also 
 Lidocaine/prilocaine

References

External links 
 
 

Local anesthetics
Anilides
AstraZeneca brands